Carbonne is a railway station in Carbonne, Occitanie, France. The station is located on the Toulouse–Bayonne railway. The station is served by TER (local) services operated by the SNCF.

Train services
The following services currently call at Carbonne:
local service (TER Occitanie) Toulouse – Saint-Gaudens – Tarbes – Pau

Bus Services

Bus connections are available at the station to Montesquieu-Volvestre.

References

Railway stations in Haute-Garonne
Railway stations in France opened in 1862